Oscaecilia ochrocephala is a species of caecilian in the family Caeciliidae.

Distribution
Oscaecilia ochrocephala
is most commonly found in Panama and Colombia. Its natural habitats are subtropical or tropical moist lowland forests, plantations, rural gardens, and heavily degraded former forests.

References

ochrocephala
Amphibians of Colombia
Amphibians of Panama
Amphibians described in 1866
Taxonomy articles created by Polbot